João Carlos Nogueira Amorim (born 11 February 1992) is a Portuguese professional footballer who plays for U.D. Vilafranquense as a midfielder.

He spent most of his career in LigaPro, making over 150 appearances in service of seven clubs.

Club career
Born in Espinho, Amorim joined FC Porto's youth system in 2003, aged 11. He was not given a professional contract after he turned 19, so he signed for Gondomar S.C. in the third division, where he made his senior debut.

Amorim joined S.L. Benfica in February 2012, with the deal being made effective in July. He was immediately loaned to Segunda Liga team C.D. Trofense, a move repeated the following season even though he was eventually called back to Benfica B in December 2013.

On 27 January 2015, Benfica announced that Amorim had signed with division two club C.D. Aves. Eighteen months later, having not played regularly, he dropped down a level to U.D. Oliveirense. In his first season in Oliveira de Azeméis, he featured regularly as they won promotion as runners-up to Real SC, and he kept his place the following year in the second tier.

After playing the first three matches of the 2018–19 campaign, Amorim cancelled his contract in August and found a new team in October in the shape of Varzim S.C. on a two-year deal. After playing most of the remaining games as the side just avoided relegation, he moved abroad for the first time in June 2019 to FC Arda Kardzhali, newcomers in the First Professional Football League (Bulgaria).

Having scored once to equalise in a 2–1 home win over FC Etar 1924 Veliko Tarnovo on 30 September 2019, Amorim returned to his country's second division the following 15 January at C.D. Feirense. Eight months later he moved again, on a one-year deal at F.C. Penafiel of the same league.

References

External links

1992 births
Living people
People from Espinho, Portugal
Sportspeople from Aveiro District
Portuguese footballers
Association football midfielders
Liga Portugal 2 players
Segunda Divisão players
Gondomar S.C. players
S.L. Benfica B players
C.D. Trofense players
C.D. Aves players
U.D. Oliveirense players
Varzim S.C. players
C.D. Feirense players
F.C. Penafiel players
U.D. Vilafranquense players
First Professional Football League (Bulgaria) players
FC Arda Kardzhali players
Liga II players
FC Brașov (2021) players
Portugal youth international footballers
Portugal under-21 international footballers
Portuguese expatriate footballers
Expatriate footballers in Bulgaria
Expatriate footballers in Romania
Portuguese expatriate sportspeople in Bulgaria
Portuguese expatriate sportspeople in Romania